In the Black is the fifth studio album by the all-female heavy metal band Kittie. The album was released on September 15, 2009. It was the first album to feature bassist Ivana "Ivy" Vujic.

Style
After the softer style of Funeral for Yesterday, Kittie returned to their more extreme sound heard on the album Until the End. In the Black incorporates elements of black metal, death metal, alternative rock and grunge.

Track listing
All songs written by Kittie.

Personnel
 Morgan Lander – lead vocals, guitars, piano 
 Mercedes Lander – drums, percussion, backing vocals 
 Tara McLeod – guitars 
 Ivana "Ivy" Vujić – bass
Siegfried Meier - producer

References

2009 albums
Kittie albums
Groove metal albums
E1 Music albums
Albums produced by Siegfried Meier